Lewis Richards is the name of:

Lewis Richards (footballer), Irish footballer
Lewis Richards (sailor), Union Navy sailor in the American Civil War